Lewis Foinglos Benson (October 23, 1850  February 2, 1926) was a Democratic member of the Wisconsin State Assembly from 1899 through 1903. A native of Oakland, Jefferson County, Wisconsin, he represented the 2nd District of Jefferson County, Wisconsin.

References

External links
The Political Graveyard

People from Oakland, Jefferson County, Wisconsin
Democratic Party members of the Wisconsin State Assembly